1957 in professional wrestling describes the year's events in the world of professional wrestling.

List of notable promotions 
Only one promotion held notable shows in 1957.

Calendar of notable shows

Championship changes

EMLL

NWA

Debuts
Debut date uncertain:
Bulldog Bob Brown
Hiro Matsuda
Jarochita Rivero
Killer Karl Krupp
Larry Hennig
Les Thornton
Swede Hanson
March  Rene Goulet
August 8  Adrian Street

Births
January 5  Robert Swenson (died in 1997) 
January 7  Mighty Wilbur(died in 2014)
January 9  El Egipcio(died in 2018) 
January 12  B. Brian Blair
January 22  911
January 26  Road Warrior Hawk(died in 2003)
February 10  Chamaco Valaguez
February 14  Dr. Karonte (died in 2019) 
February 24  C.W. Bergstrom
April 3  Daikokubō Benkei
April 4  Grigory Verichev (died in 2006) 
April 9  Joel Deaton 
April 21  Brutus Beefcake
May 1  Dave Taylor
May 4  Bart Vale
May 9  Mike Shaw(died in 2010)
May 15  Kevin Von Erich
May 18  Rob Bartlett
May 25  Dark Journey
June 12  Negro Navarro
June 20  Koko B. Ware
June 25  Floyd Creatchman(died in 2003)
July 2  Bret Hart
July 13  Irma Aguilar
July 24  Joseph Savoldi
July 27  Matt Borne(died in 2013)
July 28  Asbjørn Riis
August 10  Fred Ottman
August 11  Bill Alfonso
August 14  Gino Hernandez(died in 1986)
August 20  Rip Morgan
September 7  Corporal Kirchner(died in 2021)
September 9  Garry Robbins (died in 2013)
September 16  D. C. Drake
September 28  Mountain Fiji (died in 2018)
October 10  Farmer Brooks(died in 2022) 
October 12  Emilio Charles Jr.(died in 2012)
October 16  Lord Zoltan 
October 17  Steve McMichael
October 19  Wojo the BC Hulk 
October 24  Italian Stallion
October 25  Atsushi Onita
October 30  Jackie Sato (died in 1999) 
November 7:
King Kong Bundy(died in 2019)
Tony Schiavone
November 14  Stephen Petitpas 
November 24  Tiger Mask / Satoru Sayama
November 27  Johnny Mantell
December 8  Reverend Slick

Deaths
April 6  Gustav Frištenský, 77
August 9  Babe Zaharias 45
November 1  Giovanni Raicevich, 77

References

 
professional wrestling